The 14th/17th Minesweeper Flotilla was a Royal Navy minesweeper flotilla based in Malta during the Second World War.

History 
The flotilla comprised four fleet minesweepers from the Devonport based 14th M/S Flotilla – two  ( and ) and two  ( and ).

The four vessels were detached from 14th M/S Flotilla in 1942 and designated 17th M/S Flotilla on arrival in Gibraltar. The flotilla commander was Cdr Doran RN in HMS Speedy.

The flotilla proceeded to Malta in June 1942 as part of the Malta Convoy Operation Harpoon. The four sweepers cleared the approaches to Grand Harbour and led the Harpoon convoy into Malta. During its service in Malta the flotilla was known as 14th/17th Minesweeper Flotilla. The flotilla participated in the famous Malta Convoy Operation Pedestal during August 1942, which included the rescue of the oil tanker , for which Lt J. A. Pearson of HMS Rye was awarded the Distinguished Service Cross.

14th/17th Minesweeper Flotilla, Malta, August 1942
 HMS Speedy – Lt Cdr J. C. Brooks RN
 HMS Hebe  – Lt Cdr G. Mowatt RN
 HMS Rye  – A/Lt Cdr J. A. Pearson RNR
 HMS Hythe – Lt Cdr L. B. Miller RN sunk by U-boat in October 1943
 Commander Minesweepers Malta, Cdr J. J. Jerome RN, also in HMS Speedy

References

Sources 
 Warships of World War II, by H. T. Lenton & J. J. Colledge, pub. Ian Allan Ltd.
 Malta Convoy, by P. Shankland & A. Hunter, pub. Collins (1961).

External links 
 Minesweeping in Malta

Royal Navy flotillas
Military units and formations of the Royal Navy in World War II